Diego Hernán Acoglanis (born 3 February 1982) is an Argentine footballer currently playing for clubs of Argentina and Chile.

Teams
  Rosario Central 2002-2003
  Central Córdoba 2004-2005
  Coquimbo Unido 2006-2007

References

 Profile at BDFA 

1982 births
Living people
Argentine expatriate footballers
Argentine footballers
Rosario Central footballers
Coquimbo Unido footballers
Expatriate footballers in Chile
Association football midfielders